Şiştəpə (also, Shishtepe) is a village and municipality in the Shamkir Rayon of Azerbaijan.  It has a population of 5,259. 

This village surrounds a hill named "Shishtapa" (Shish (orig:Şiş): High and Tapa (orig:Təpə-Hill)).  Placed 5 km far from Shamkir Rayonu.

References 

Populated places in Shamkir District